In the U.S. state of Minnesota, a legislative route is a highway number defined by the Minnesota State Legislature. The routes from 1 to 70 are constitutional routes, defined as part of the Babcock Amendment to the Minnesota State Constitution, passed November 2, 1920. All of them were listed in the constitution until a 1974 rewrite. Though they are now listed separately in §161.114 of the Minnesota Statutes, the definitions are legally considered to be part of the constitution, and cannot be altered or removed without an amendment. Legislative routes with numbers greater than 70 can be added or deleted by the legislature.

Until 1933 Constitutional Routes corresponded exactly to the number marked on the highways, but this is no longer necessarily the case. In fact, it is common for CR highways to be composed of several different trunk highways.  When the U.S. Highway system was created in 1926, many of these roads were made up of one or more U.S. highways.  Today, they now use a mix of Minnesota state highways, U.S. highways, and Interstate highways.

Constitutional Route 1 is currently one of the most complex routes, composed of:
U.S. Highway 65 from the Iowa border to Albert Lea, Minnesota
Interstate 35 to Faribault
Minnesota State Highway 3 and MN-149 to Saint Paul
U.S. Highway 61 to Wyoming
Interstate 35 to Rush City
Minnesota State Highway 361 to Rock Creek
Minnesota State Highway 23 through Hinckley
the MN-73/27 loop through Moose Lake
Interstate 35 between Moose Lake and MN-210
the MN-210/45 loop through Carlton
Interstate 35 to Duluth
Minnesota State Highway 61 to the Canadian border
However, the route can be considered to be superseded along almost its entire length by Interstate 35 (and I-35E) and Minnesota State Highway 61. By contrast, Constitutional Route 58 still has the same marked number and extent that it did in 1920.

There is some ambiguity in how literally the Minnesota Department of Transportation must interpret the constitutional routes.  In some cases, the routes no longer directly serve communities for which they were once designated, but are routed along nearby highways instead.

List of routes

Constitutional Routes 1–70
Constitutional Route 1: Iowa to Ontario via Albert Lea, Owatonna, Faribault, Northfield, Farmington, St. Paul, White Bear, Forest Lake, Wyoming, Rush City, Pine City, Hinckley, Sandstone, Moose Lake, Carlton, Duluth, Two Harbors, and Grand Marais
Constitutional Route 2: Duluth to North Dakota via Carlton, McGregor, Aitkin, Brainerd, Motley, Staples, Wadena, Detroit, and Moorhead
Constitutional Route 3: Wisconsin to North Dakota via La Crescent, Winona, Kellogg, Wabasha, Lake City, Red Wing, Hastings, St. Paul, Minneapolis, Osseo, Champlin, Anoka, Elk River, Big Lake, St. Cloud, Albany, Sauk Centre, Alexandria, Elbow Lake, Fergus Falls, and Breckenridge
Constitutional Route 4: Iowa to International Falls via Jackson, Windom, Sanborn, Redwood Falls, Morton, Olivia, Willmar, Paynesville, Sauk Centre, Long Prairie, Wadena, Park Rapids, Itasca State Park, and Bemidji
Constitutional Route 5: Iowa to Swan River via Blue Earth, Winnebago, Mankato, St. Peter, Le Sueur, Jordan, Shakopee, Minneapolis, Cambridge, Mora, and McGregor
Constitutional Route 6: Iowa to Manitoba via Luverne, Pipestone, Lake Benton, Ivanhoe, Canby, Madison, Bellingham, Odessa, Ortonville, Graceville, Dumont, Wheaton, Breckenridge, Moorhead, Kragnes, Georgetown, Perley, Hendrum, Ada, Crookston, Warren, Donaldson, and Hallock
Constitutional Route 7: Winona to South Dakota via St. Charles, Rochester, Kasson, Dodge Center, Claremont, Owatonna, Waseca, Mankato, St. Peter, New Ulm, Springfield, Tracy, and Lake Benton
Constitutional Route 8: Duluth to North Dakota via Floodwood, Swan River, Grand Rapids, Cass Lake, Bemidji, Bagley, Erskine, Crookston, and East Grand Forks
Constitutional Route 9: La Crescent to South Dakota via Hokah, Houston, Rushford, Lanesboro, Preston, Fountain, Spring Valley, Austin, Albert Lea, Blue Earth, Fairmont, Jackson, Worthington, and Luverne
Constitutional Route 10: Minneapolis to Wheaton via Montrose, Cokato, Litchfield, Willmar, Benson, Morris, and Herman
Constitutional Route 11: Duluth to Donaldson via Eveleth, Virginia, Cook, Orr, Cusson, International Falls, Baudette, Warroad, Roseau, and Greenbush
Constitutional Route 12: Wisconsin to Madison via St. Paul, Minneapolis, Hopkins, Norwood, Glencoe, Olivia, Granite Falls, Montevideo, and Dawson
Constitutional Route 13: Albert Lea to Jordan via Waseca, Waterville, Montgomery, and New Prague
Constitutional Route 14: Ivanhoe to Gaylord via Marshall, Redwood Falls, Morton, and Winthrop
Constitutional Route 15: Iowa to Winthrop via Fairmont, Madelia, and New Ulm
Constitutional Route 16: southwest of Mankato to Worthington via Madelia, St. James, Windom, and Fulda
Constitutional Route 17: Fulda to Granite Falls to Slayton, Garvin, and Marshall
Constitutional Route 18: Elk River to east of Brainerd via Princeton, Milaca, and Onamia
Constitutional Route 19: Brainerd to Cass Lake via Pine River and Walker
Constitutional Route 20: Iowa to Douglas via Canton, Harmony, Preston, Fountain, Chatfield, Oronoco, Pine Island, Zumbrota, and Cannon Falls
Constitutional Route 21: Zumbrota to St. Peter via Kenyon, Faribault, Le Sueur Center, and Cleveland
Constitutional Route 22: St. Peter to Paynesville via Gaylord, Glencoe, Hutchinson, and Litchfield
Constitutional Route 23: Paynesville to south of Hinckley via St. Cloud, Foley, Milaca, Ogilvie, and Mora
Constitutional Route 24: Litchfield to St. Cloud
Constitutional Route 25: Belle Plaine to Big Lake via Norwood, Watertown, Montrose, Buffalo, and Monticello
Constitutional Route 26: Benson to Ortonville
Constitutional Route 27: St. Cloud to Brainerd via Sauk Rapids, Royalton, and Little Falls
Constitutional Route 28: Little Falls to South Dakota via Sauk Centre, Glenwood, Starbuck, Morris, Graceville, and Browns Valley
Constitutional Route 29: Glenwood to west of Wadena via Alexandria, Parkers Prairie, and Deer Creek
Constitutional Route 30: Fergus Falls to Erskine via Pelican Rapids, Detroit Lakes, and Mahnomen
Constitutional Route 31: Ada to Mahnomen
Constitutional Route 32: east of Crookston to Greenbush via Red Lake Falls, Thief River Falls, and Middle River
Constitutional Route 33: Thief River Falls to Warren
Constitutional Route 34: Detroit to west of Grand Rapids via Park Rapids, Walker, and Remer
Constitutional Route 35: Mille Lacs Lake to Ely via Aitkin, Grand Rapids, Hibbing, Chisholm, Buhl, Mountain Iron, Virginia, Gilbert, McKinley, Biwabik, Aurora, and Tower
Constitutional Route 36: Fergus Falls to east of Henning
Constitutional Route 37: Little Falls to Motley
Constitutional Route 38: Montevideo to Starbuck via Benson
Constitutional Route 39: Mankato to west of Albert Lea via Mapleton, Minnesota Lake, and Wells
Constitutional Route 40: Iowa to Owatonna via Lyle, Austin, and Blooming Prairie
Constitutional Route 41: Blooming Prairie to Hayfield
Constitutional Route 42: east of Rochester to Kellogg via Elgin and Plainview
Constitutional Route 43: Rushford to Winona
Constitutional Route 44: Hokah to Canton via Caledonia
Constitutional Route 45: Wisconsin to St. Paul via Stillwater and Lake Elmo
Constitutional Route 46: Wisconsin to Wyoming via Taylors Falls and Center City
Constitutional Route 47: Slayton to Pipestone
Constitutional Route 48: west of Granite Falls to Canby via Clarkfield
Constitutional Route 49: east of Montevideo to south of Willmar via Clara City
Constitutional Route 50: Cannon Falls to Minneapolis via Farmington
Constitutional Route 51: Shakopee to north of Shakopee
Constitutional Route 52: south of Minneapolis to Fort Snelling towards St. Paul
Constitutional Route 53: Hastings to South St. Paul
Constitutional Route 54: Elbow Lake to Herman
Constitutional Route 55: northwest of Carlton to Cloquet
Constitutional Route 56: east of Austin to Kenyon via Brownsdale, Hayfield, Dodge Center, and West Concord
Constitutional Route 57: Mantorville to south of Mantorville
Constitutional Route 58: Zumbrota to Red Wing
Constitutional Route 59: Iowa to Lake City via Spring Valley, Stewartville, Rochester, Zumbro Falls
Constitutional Route 60: Faribault to Madison Lake via Morristown and Waterville
Constitutional Route 61: Deer River to Big Falls
Constitutional Route 62: Anoka to St. Paul
Constitutional Route 63: south of Forest Lake to Minneapolis
Constitutional Route 64: north of Fergus Falls to south of Moorhead via Rothsay and Barnesville
Constitutional Route 65: Bagley to south of Red Lake Falls via Clearbrook, Gonvick, Gully, Brooks, and Terrebonne
Constitutional Route 66: Montevideo to north of Appleton
Constitutional Route 67: Echo to Granite Falls
Constitutional Route 68: Marshall to Canby via Minneota
Constitutional Route 69: Buffalo to Paynesville via Maple Lake, Annandale, and Eden Valley
Constitutional Route 70: west of New Ulm to Hector via Fort Ridgely and Fairfax

Legislative Routes 71–140
Legislative Route 71: Little Falls, Onamia, Isle, McGrath, and Moose Lake
Legislative Route 72: Bemidji, Waskish, Baudette
Legislative Route 73: Zumbrota, Mazeppa, Zumbro Falls, and Wabasha
Legislative Route 74: Weaver, St. Charles, and Chatfield
Legislative Route 75: Winona to Wisconsin
Legislative Route 76: Wilson, Houston, and Caledonia to Iowa
Legislative Route 77: Rushford, Chatfield, Stewartville, and Hayfield
Legislative Route 78: Rushford to Mabel
Legislative Route 79: Harmony to Iowa
Legislative Route 80: Wykoff to Preston
Legislative Route 81: Austin to LeRoy
Legislative Route 82: Blooming Prairie, Ellendale, Mapleton, and St. James
Legislative Route 83: Mankato to New Ulm
Legislative Route 84: Sleepy Eye, St. James, and Sherburn to Iowa
Legislative Route 85: Windom, Worthington, and Bigelow to Iowa
Legislative Route 86: Iowa to Lakefield, Windom
Legislative Route 87: Wells, Kiester to Iowa
Legislative Route 88: South Dakota to Jasper, Pipestone, Marshall, and Montevideo
Legislative Route 89: Pipestone to South Dakota
Legislative Route 90: Ivanhoe to South Dakota
Legislative Route 91: Iowa to Adrian, Lake Wilson, and Russell
Legislative Route 92: Currie, Jeffers
Legislative Route 93: Redwood Falls, Sleepy Eye
Legislative Route 94: Hastings to Wisconsin
Legislative Route 95: Point Douglas, Bayport, Stillwater, Taylors Falls
Legislative Route 96: Stillwater, New Brighton
Legislative Route 97: Forest Lake, Taylors Falls
Legislative Route 98: Forest Lake, Center City
Legislative Route 99: Le Center, Shields Lake
Legislative Route 100: Gaylord, Henderson, New Prague, Northfield, Cannon Falls and Red Wing
Legislative Route 101: Repealed
Legislative Route 102: Connects Constitutional Route 1 through St. Paul
Legislative Route 103: Connects Constitutional Route 1 through Duluth
Legislative Route 104: Connects Constitutional Route 3 through St. Paul
Legislative Route 105: Connects Washington Avenue with Constitutional Route 5 through Minneapolis
Legislative Route 106: Connects Constitutional Route 8 through Duluth, via the Richard I. Bong Memorial Bridge.
Legislative Route 107: Connects Constitutional Route 10 with Washington Avenue in Minneapolis
Legislative Route 108: St. Paul to Hennepin County.
Legislative Route 109: St. Paul's eastern city limits to Route 1.
Legislative Route 110: Minneapolis, Anoka, Ogilvie, Isle, and Aitkin
Legislative Route 111: Fort Snelling to downtown St. Paul
Legislative Route 112: St. Paul's southern city limits to St. Paul
Legislative Route 113: St. Paul's northern city limits to Route 104.
Legislative Route 114: Discontinued and removed
Legislative Route 115: Eagan to St. Paul via Robert Street and the Lafayette Freeway
Legislative Route 116: Kenyon to Minneapolis.
Legislative Route 117: Prior Lake to White Bear.
Legislative Route 118: Roseville to Stillwater.
Legislative Route 119: Clara City to Excelsior.
Legislative Route 120: Discontinued and removed
Legislative Route 121: Gaylord to Route 5.
Legislative Route 122: Mankato and Nicollet to south of Gaylord.
Legislative Route 123: Repealed
Legislative Route 124: Wells to Alden
Legislative Route 125: Snelling Avenue and U.S. 10 from St. Paul to I-35W.
Legislative Route 126: Repealed
Legislative Route 127: Discontinued and removed
Legislative Route 128: Mantorville, Wanamingo, and Hader
Legislative Route 129: Discontinued and removed
Legislative Route 130: Minneapolis, and Fort Snelling via Broadway Ave and Hiawatha Ave
Legislative Route 131: Randall, and Camp Ripley Junction
Legislative Route 132: St. Cloud, Princeton, Cambridge, and Taylors Falls
Legislative Route 133: Braham, West Rock, and Rock Creek, to Wisconsin.
Legislative Route 134: Grasston, and Brook Park
Legislative Route 135: Little Falls, Long Prairie, and Osakis
Legislative Route 136: Bemidji, and Roseau
Legislative Route 137: Garrison, Deerwood, Crosby, and Remer
Legislative Route 138: Walker, and Kabekona
Legislative Route 139: Pine River, and Walker
Legislative Route 140: Baudette, and Wheelers Point

Legislative Routes 141–210
Legislative Route 141: Connects Constitutional Route 4 and Constitutional Route 28 through Sauk Centre
Legislative Route 142: Paynesville, Glenwood, and Elbow Lake to South Dakota
Legislative Route 143: Sunburg, and Glenwood
Legislative Route 144: Madison, Appleton, Morris, and Barrett
Legislative Route 145: Willmar to Route 144.
Legislative Route 146: Maynard to Route 12.
Legislative Route 147: Appleton to Route 6.
Legislative Route 148: Ortonville to Route 28.
Legislative Route 149: Ortonville to South Dakota.
Legislative Route 150: Hector to Paynesville.
Legislative Route 151: Kimball to Winthrop.
Legislative Route 152: Herman to Breckenridge.
Legislative Route 153: Discontinued and removed
Legislative Route 154: Canby to South Dakota
Legislative Route 155: South of Madison to South Dakota.
Legislative Route 156: Route 394 to Route 62.
Legislative Route 157: Route 35 to Route 110.
Legislative Route 158: International Falls to Black Bay.
Legislative Route 159: Swan River, Nashwauk, and Little Fork
Legislative Route 160: Tower to Red Lake.
Legislative Route 161: Red Wing to Wisconsin.
Legislative Route 162: Remer to Route 8.
Legislative Route 163: Moose Lake to south of Orr.
Legislative Route 164: Cloquet to Route 11.
Legislative Route 165: Deer River to Route 4.
Legislative Route 166: Ely to Route 1.
Legislative Route 167: Virginia to Tower.
Legislative Route 168: Itasca State Park to Mahnomen.
Legislative Route 169: Bagley to Route 168.
Legislative Route 170: Thief River Falls to Route 136.
Legislative Route 171: St. Vincent to North Dakota.
Legislative Route 172: Donaldson to North Dakota.
Legislative Route 173: Warren to North Dakota.
Legislative Route 174: Erskine to the Canadian border.
Legislative Route 175: Crookston to Hendrum.
Legislative Route 176: Halstad to North Dakota.
Legislative Route 177: Route 32 to Route 182.
Legislative Route 178: Crookston to Fertile.
Legislative Route 179: Ada to Barnesville.
Legislative Route 180: Erdahl to Ottertail.
Legislative Route 181: Henning to Perham.
Legislative Route 182: Route 30 to Barnesville
Legislative Route 183: Henning to Staples.
Legislative Route 184: Deer Creek to Route 2.
Legislative Route 185: Sandstone to Duluth.
Legislative Route 186: Route 110 to Askov.
Legislative Route 187: Elk River to Route 117.
Legislative Route 188: Buffalo to Route 110.
Legislative Route 189: Mora to Route 132.
Legislative Route 190: Wheaton to Browns Valley.
Legislative Route 191: Route 190 to South Dakota.
Legislative Route 192: Hinckley to Wisconsin.
Legislative Route 193: Motley to Route 34, west of Walker (present-day Akeley).
Legislative Route 194: Mendota to Route 102.
Legislative Route 195: Albert Lea to Iowa.
Legislative Route 196: Grand Rapids to Bigfork.
Legislative Route 197: Park Rapids to Backus.
Legislative Route 198: La Crescent to Iowa.
Legislative Route 199: Austin to Iowa.
Legislative Route 200: Route 4 near Itasca State Park to Waubun.
Legislative Route 201: Waldorf to Mankato.
Legislative Route 202: Eveleth to Gilbert.
Legislative Route 203: Proctor and Duluth.
Legislative Route 204: Connecting Route 11 to Route 103 in Duluth.
Legislative Route 205: Herman to Alexandria.
Legislative Route 206: Pelican Rapids to south of Perham.
Legislative Route 207: Frazee to Menahga.
Legislative Route 208: Starbuck to Garfield.
Legislative Route 209: Becker, Foley, Gilman, Pierz, and Brainerd.
Legislative Route 210: Benson to New London.

Legislative Routes 211–280
Legislative Route 212: Beginning at a point on Legislative Route 3 at or near Robbinsdale, thence extending in a northeasterly and easterly direction to a point on Legislative Route 62 easterly of New Brighton, affording necessary and reasonable means of communication to industrial areas engaged in the manufacture of essential war materials, and bringing into the Trunk Highway System an important route a portion of which has been heretofore improved with federal aid, and all which has been approved for surveys and plans with federal funds by the Public Roads Administration.
Legislative Route 213: Beginning at a point on Legislative Route 185 in Duluth, thence extending in an easterly direction to a point on the line between the states of Minnesota and Wisconsin.
Legislative Route 214: Beginning at a point on Constitutional Legislative Route 3, now known as Trunk Highway 61 in the city of Wabasha, Minnesota, thence northerly to a point on the line between the states of Minnesota and Wisconsin.
Legislative Route 215: Beginning at a point on Legislative Route 1, at or near Carlton; thence extending in an easterly direction to a point on Legislative Route 185.
Legislative Route 216: Beginning at a point on Legislative Route 35, at or near Hibbing; thence extending in an easterly direction to a point on Legislative Route 11 southerly of Eveleth.
Legislative Route 217: Beginning at a point on Legislative Route 159, at or near Littlefork; thence extending in an easterly direction to a point on Legislative Route 11.
Legislative Route 218: Beginning at a point on Legislative Route 11, westerly of Roseau; thence extending in a westerly direction thence in a general northerly direction to reach the international boundary near Pinecreek.
Legislative Route 219: Beginning at a point on Legislative Route 170 easterly of Thief River Falls; thence extending in a general northerly direction to a point on Legislative Route 136 westerly of Grygla.
Legislative Route 220: Beginning at a point on Legislative Route 175 at or near Climax; thence extending in a general northwesterly direction to a point on Legislative Route 8 at or near East Grand Forks; thence continuing in a general northerly direction to a point on Legislative Route 173 westerly of Warren; thence continuing in a general northerly direction to a point on Legislative Route 172 westerly of Donaldson.
Legislative Route 221: Beginning at a point on Legislative Route 166 in Ely; thence extending in a general northeasterly direction to a point north of the center of Section 20, Township 63 North, Range 11 West.
Legislative Route 222: Beginning at a point in or adjacent to Oklee; thence extending in a general southerly direction to a point on Legislative Route 65. (currently being repealed)
Legislative Route 223: Beginning at a point in or adjacent to Leonard; thence extending in a westerly direction to a point on Legislative Route 65.
Legislative Route 224: Repealed
Legislative Route 225: Repealed
Legislative Route 226: Beginning at a point in Section 10, Township 140 North, Range 34 West; thence extending in a general southerly direction to a point on Legislative Route 34.
Legislative Route 227: Repealed
Legislative Route 228: Repealed
Legislative Route 229: Beginning at a point on Legislative Route 64 southerly of Barnesville; thence extending in a general easterly direction to a point on Legislative Route 30, at or near Pelican Rapids.
Legislative Route 230: Beginning at a point on Legislative Route 6, at or near Moorhead; thence extending in a general westerly direction to a point on the boundary between the states of Minnesota and North Dakota.
Legislative Route 231: Discontinued and removed
Legislative Route 232: Repealed
Legislative Route 233: Repealed
Legislative Route 234: Beginning at a point on Legislative Route 138 westerly of Laporte; thence extending in a general southerly direction to a point on Legislative Route 34, at or near Akeley.
Legislative Route 235: Repealed
Legislative Route 236: Discontinued and removed
Legislative Route 237: Beginning at a point in or adjacent to New Munich; thence extending in a general northerly direction to a point on Legislative Route 3. (currently being repealed)
Legislative Route 238: Beginning at a point on Legislative Route 3 westerly of Albany; thence extending in a general northerly direction to a point at or near Upsala; thence continuing in a northerly direction to a point on Legislative Route 28 westerly of Little Falls.
Legislative Route 239: Beginning at a point on Legislative Route 27, at or near Sauk Rapids; thence extending in a general southwesterly direction crossing the Mississippi River; thence continuing in a general southerly direction to a point on Legislative Route 3 at or near St. Cloud.
Legislative Route 240: Beginning at a point on Legislative Route 69, at or near Annandale; thence extending in a general northerly direction to a point on Legislative Route 3.
Legislative Route 241: Beginning at a point in or adjacent to St. Michael; then extending in a general easterly direction to a point on Legislative Route 392.
Legislative Route 242: Repealed
Legislative Route 243: Beginning at a point on Legislative Route 95 southerly of Legislative Route 46; thence extending in a general southeasterly direction to a point on the boundary between the states of Minnesota and Wisconsin.
Legislative Route 244: Beginning at a point on Legislative Route 1 southerly of White Bear Lake; thence extending in a general easterly and northerly direction to a point at or near Mahtomedi; thence continuing in a general northerly direction to a point on Legislative Route 96.

[See Note.]

Legislative Route 245: Beginning at a point at or near the junction of Legislative Route 3 and Legislative Route 20; thence extending in a general westerly direction to a point on Legislative Route 50.
Legislative Route 246: Beginning at a point in or adjacent to Nerstrand; thence extending in a general northerly direction to a point westerly of Dennison; thence continuing in a general northwesterly direction to a point on Legislative Route 1 at or near Northfield.
Legislative Route 247: Beginning at a point on Legislative Route 59 southerly of Zumbro Falls; thence extending in a general easterly direction to a point on Legislative Route 42 at or near Plainview.
Legislative Route 248: Beginning at a point in or adjacent to Altura; thence extending in a general easterly direction to a point in or adjacent to Rollingstone; thence continuing in a general easterly direction to a point on Legislative Route 3.
Legislative Route 249: Discontinued and removed
Legislative Route 250: Beginning at a point on Legislative Route 9, at or near Lanesboro; thence extending in a general northerly direction to a point on Legislative Route 77.
Legislative Route 251: Beginning at a point on Legislative Route 1, at or near Clarks Grove; thence extending in a general easterly direction to a point on Legislative Route 40.
Legislative Route 252: Beginning at a point on Legislative Route 9 westerly of Austin; thence extending northeasterly to a point on Legislative Route 40 northerly of the south line of Section 34, Township 103 North, Range 18 West, Mower County, Minnesota; thence extending southeasterly to a point on Legislative Route 9 in or near Austin; thence extending easterly along Legislative Route 9 to a point in or near Austin and thence southerly and westerly to a point on Legislative Route 40 in or near Austin.
Legislative Route 253: Repealed
Legislative Route 254: Repealed
Legislative Route 255: Beginning at a point on Legislative Route 5, at or near Winnebago; thence extending in a general easterly direction to a point on Legislative Route 39, at or near Wells.
Legislative Route 256: Repealed
Legislative Route 257: Beginning at a point in or adjacent to Hanska; thence extending in an easterly direction to a point on Legislative Route 15.
Legislative Route 258: Repealed
Legislative Route 259: Beginning at a point on Statutory Legislative Route 100, at or near Henderson; thence extending in a general southeasterly direction to a point at or near Le Sueur.
Legislative Route 260: Beginning at a point on Legislative Route 5 southwesterly of Shakopee, thence extending in a northerly direction to a point on proposed Legislative Route 12, thence extending in a northeasterly direction to a point on Legislative Route 5 at or near Edina.
Legislative Route 261: Repealed
Legislative Route 262: Repealed
Legislative Route 263: Beginning at a point in or adjacent to Ceylon; thence extending in a general northerly direction to a point on Legislative Route 391 westerly of Fairmont.  (currently being repealed)
Legislative Route 264: Beginning at a point in or adjacent to Round Lake; thence extending in a general northerly direction to a point on Legislative Route 391 easterly of Worthington.
Legislative Route 265: Beginning at a point on Legislative Route 85 northeasterly of Bigelow; thence extending in a southerly direction to a point on the boundary between the states of Minnesota and Iowa.
Legislative Route 266: Repealed
Legislative Route 267: Beginning at a point in or adjacent to Iona; thence extending in a general northerly direction to a point on Legislative Route 17, at or near Slayton.  (currently being repealed)
Legislative Route 268: Repealed
Legislative Route 269: Beginning at a point on Legislative Route 88, at or southerly of Jasper; thence extending in a westerly direction to a point on the boundary between the states of Minnesota and South Dakota.
Legislative Route 270: Beginning at a point in or adjacent to Hills; thence extending in a general easterly direction to a point on Legislative Route 6.
Legislative Route 271: Beginning at a point on the boundary between the states of Minnesota and South Dakota near the northwest corner of Section 30, Township 113 North, Range 46 West; thence extending in an easterly and southerly direction to a point in or adjacent to Hendricks; thence continuing in a southerly direction to a point on Legislative Route 90.
Legislative Route 272: Beginning at a point on Legislative Route 14 northerly of Milroy; thence extending in a southerly and easterly direction to a point on Legislative Route 4 south of Redwood Falls; thence continuing in an easterly direction to a point on Legislative Route 93, in or adjacent to Morgan.
Legislative Route 273: Repealed
Legislative Route 274: Beginning at a point in or adjacent to Wood Lake; thence extending in a general northerly direction to a point on Legislative Route 67.
Legislative Route 275: Repealed
Legislative Route 276: Beginning at a point on the boundary line between the states of Minnesota and South Dakota westerly of Marietta, thence extending in an easterly direction to a point in or adjacent to Marietta, thence extending in a general easterly direction to a point on Legislative Route 6.
Legislative Route 277: Repealed
Legislative Route 278: Discontinued and removed
Legislative Route 279: Cedar Avenue from Minneapolis to Apple Valley.

Legislative Routes 281–350
Legislative Route 280: St. Paul to "at or near" New Brighton.
Legislative Route 281: An alternate route for Route 103 through Duluth.
Legislative Route 282: Jordan to Spring Lake.
Legislative Route 283: Waubun to Route 177.
Legislative Route 284: Waconia to Route 12.
Legislative Route 285: Discontinued and removed
Legislative Route 286: Marcell to Route 61.
Legislative Route 287: Grey Eagle to Route 4.
Legislative Route 288: Repealed
Legislative Route 289: Route 1 to the Moose Lake Treatment Center.
Legislative Route 290: Repealed
Legislative Route 291: Repealed
Legislative Route 292: Route 3 to the Minnesota Training School for Boys in Red Wing.
Legislative Route 293: Repealed
Legislative Route 294: Repealed
Legislative Route 295: Repealed
Legislative Route 296: Discontinued and removed
Legislative Route 297: Repealed
Legislative Route 298: Route 21 to Route 323. (currently being repealed)
Legislative Route 299: Route 21 to the Minnesota State Academy for the Deaf. (currently being repealed)
Legislative Route 300: Repealed
Subd. 232.Legislative Route 301.

Beginning at a point on Legislative Route 3; thence extending in a general westerly direction to the main entrance of the Minnesota State Reformatory for Men.

Subd. 233.

[Repealed, 1Sp2003 c 22 s 3]

Subd. 234.Legislative Route 303.

Discontinued and removed from T.H. system. See Laws 1973, Chapter 249.

Subd. 235.Legislative Route 304.

Beginning at a point on Legislative Route 38 at or near Montevideo; thence extending in an easterly direction to connect with Legislative Route 49 easterly of Montevideo.

Subd. 236. Legislative Route 305.

[Repealed, 2001 c 213 s 29]

Subd. 237.Legislative Route 306.

Beginning at a point on Legislative Route 35 at or near Gilbert; thence extending in a general northeasterly direction to a point on Legislative Route 35 at or near Biwabik.

Subd. 238.Legislative Route 307.

Beginning at a point on Constitutional Legislative Route 8 at or near East Grand Forks; thence extending in a general westerly direction to a point on the boundary between the states of North Dakota and Minnesota.

Subd. 239.Legislative Route 308.

Beginning at a point on Constitutional Legislative Route 11 westerly of Fox; thence running in a general northerly direction to a point on Statutory Legislative Route 218 at or near Ross.

Subd. 240.Legislative Route 309.

MS 2012 [Repealed, 2014 c 287 s 26]

Subd. 241.Legislative Route 310.

Beginning at a point on Legislative Route 11 at or near Roseau, thence extending in a northerly direction to a point on the boundary line between the State of Minnesota and the Province of Manitoba, Canada.

Subd. 242.Legislative Route 311.

Beginning at a point on Legislative Route 289 at or near the entrance to the Moose Lake State Hospital, thence extending in an easterly direction to a point on Legislative Route 390.

Subd. 243.

Legislative Route 312. [Discontinued and removed]

Subd. 244.Legislative Route 313.

Beginning at a point on Legislative Route 11 at or near Warroad, thence extending in a northerly direction to a point on the boundary between the State of Minnesota and the Province of Manitoba, Canada.

Subd. 245.Legislative Route 314.

Beginning at a point on Legislative Route 110 southerly of St. Francis, thence extending in a general easterly direction to a point on Legislative Route 5, thence extending in a general easterly direction to a point on Legislative Route 1 at or near Forest Lake, provided, however, that such route shall not be established, constructed or marked until receipt by the adjutant general of Minnesota of the authority from the proper federal agency to proceed with the acquisition of land for the construction of the proposed Bethel airport affording Bethel Airport a reasonable means of communication with other places within the state.

Subd. 246.Legislative Route 315.

Beginning at a point on Legislative Route 158 in International Falls, thence extending in a general northerly direction to the boundary line between the State of Minnesota and the Province of Ontario, Canada.

Subd. 247.Legislative Route 316.

Beginning at a point on Legislative Route 3 at or near Hastings, thence extending in a southeasterly direction to a point on Legislative Route 3 at or near Red Wing.

Subd. 248.Legislative Route 317.

Beginning at a point on Legislative Route 220 westerly of Stephen in Marshall County, thence extending in a westerly direction to the boundary line between the state of Minnesota and the state of North Dakota.

Subd. 249.Legislative Route 318.

Discontinued and removed from T.H. system. See Laws 1974, Chapter 151.

Subd. 250.Legislative Route 319.

Beginning at a point on Legislative Route 6 in the city of Ortonville; thence in a general northwesterly direction to a point on Legislative Route 148 in Ortonville.

Subd. 251.Legislative Route 320.

Beginning at a point on Legislative Route 116, easterly of Nerstrand; thence extending in a general westerly direction to a point on Legislative Route 246 in or adjacent to Nerstrand.

Subd. 252.Legislative Route 321.

Beginning at a point on Legislative Route 22 in Eden Valley, thence extending in a general northerly direction, so as to run easterly of Horse Shoe Lake, to a point on Legislative Route 23 in Richmond.

Subd. 253.Legislative Route 322.

[Repealed, 2001 c 213 s 29]

Subd. 254.Legislative Route 323.

Beginning at a point on Legislative Route 298 at or near the intersection of Legislative Route 298 and Barron Road; thence extending westerly, southerly and northeasterly to a point on Legislative Route 298. (currently being repealed)

Subd. 255. Route 324A.

Beginning at a point on Legislative Route 6 in Hallock; thence extending in a general westerly direction following generally the location of present County State-Aid Highway 3 to a point on the boundary line between the state of Minnesota and the state of North Dakota.

Subd. 256.Legislative Route 325.

Beginning at a point on Constitutional Legislative Route 11 in Baudette, thence extending in a northerly and northeasterly direction to the boundary line between the state of Minnesota and the Province of Ontario, Canada.

Subd. 257.Legislative Route 326.

[Repealed, 1996 c 456 s 24]

Subd. 258.

Legislative Route 327. [Discontinued and removed]

Subd. 259.Legislative Route 328.

Beginning at a point on Legislative Route 6 in Hallock; thence extending in a general easterly direction to a point on Legislative Route 174, northerly of Lake Bronson.

Subd. 260.Legislative Route 329.

Beginning at a point on Legislative Route 144 in or near Morris; thence extending in an easterly direction into and through the grounds of the West Central School and Experiment Station of the University of Minnesota and terminating at the east boundary thereof.

Subd. 261.Legislative Route 330.

Beginning at a point on Legislative Route 7 westerly of Lamberton; thence extending into and through the grounds of the Southwest Experiment Station of the University of Minnesota; thence back to a point on Legislative Route 7.

Subd. 262.Legislative Route 331.

[Repealed, 1996 c 455 art 3 s 34]

Subd. 263.Legislative Route 332.

MS 2010 [Repealed, 2011 c 34 s 1]

Legislative Route 333: I-94 to U.S. 10.

Subd. 265.Legislative Route 334.

Beginning at a point on Legislative Route 116 at or near Inver Grove Heights; thence extending in a general northerly direction to a point on Legislative Route 102 at or near St. Paul.

Subd. 266.Legislative Route 335.

MS 2008 [Repealed, 2008 c 350 art 1 s 89]

Subd. 267.Legislative Route 336.

Beginning at a point on Legislative Route 2 at or near Dilworth; thence extending in a general southerly direction following generally the location of present County State-Aid Highway 11 to a point on Legislative Route 392.

Subd. 268.Legislative Route 337.

From a point on Legislative Route 2 in the city of Brainerd thence extending southwesterly to its intersection with new, marked Trunk Highway 371 as signed on May 30, 2001.

Subd. 269.Legislative Route 338.

Beginning at a point on Legislative Route 7 easterly of Rochester and thence extending in a southerly direction to a point on Legislative Route 391.

Subd. 270.Legislative Route 339.

Beginning at a point on Legislative Route 45, thence extending easterly to a point on the boundary line between the states of Minnesota and Wisconsin.

Legislative Routes 351–396
Routes 380 to 385 were defined in and after 1975, and "may be added by order of the commissioner of transportation to the trunk highway system"; only 383, 384, and 385 have been added, and 385 no longer exists.
Legislative Route 380: Shepard Road in St. Paul
Legislative Route 381: deleted from the statutes (was a planned extension of the Lafayette Freeway northwest to I-35E)
Legislative Route 382: part of I-35E in St. Paul (actually covered by Route 390)
Legislative Route 383: Bloomington to Brooklyn Park
Legislative Route 384: Eden Prairie to southeast of Minneapolis
Legislative Route 385: deleted from the statutes (was Washington Avenue in Minneapolis)

Routes 390 to 396 were defined in and after the 1950s as portions of the Interstate Highway System "to take advantage of federal aid made available by the United States to the state of Minnesota for highway purposes".
Legislative Route 390: Iowa to Wisconsin (I-35, I-35E, and I-535)
Legislative Route 391: South Dakota to Wisconsin (I-90)
Legislative Route 392: North Dakota to Wisconsin (I-94)
Legislative Route 393: loop around the Twin Cities (I-494 and I-694)
Legislative Route 394: alternate to Route 390 through Minneapolis (I-35W)
Legislative Route 395: Duluth (part of I-35)
Legislative Route 396: Duluth (extension of I-35)
Interstate 394 is not a separate legislative route, instead being parts of Route 10 and Route 107, which carried U.S. Highway 12 along the same alignment before I-394 was built.

See also

County state aid highway (CSAH)

References

MnDOT Roadway Data, accessed August 2007; the Control Section Report includes a full cross-reference of current trunk highways and legislative route numbers.

External links
Minnesota Statutes §161.114: Constitutional trunk highways
Minnesota Statutes §161.115: Additional trunk highways (legislative routes)

Transportation in Minnesota
Minnesota law
State highways in Minnesota
Lists of roads in Minnesota